Webster Township may refer to:

Indiana
 Webster Township, Harrison County, Indiana
 Webster Township, Wayne County, Indiana

Iowa
 Webster Township, Hamilton County, Iowa
 Webster Township, Madison County, Iowa, in Madison County, Iowa
 Webster Township, Polk County, Iowa
 Webster Township, Webster County, Iowa

Kansas
 Webster Township, Smith County, Kansas, in Smith County, Kansas
 Webster Township, Wilson County, Kansas

Michigan
 Webster Township, Michigan

Minnesota
 Webster Township, Rice County, Minnesota

Nebraska
 Webster Township, Dodge County, Nebraska

North Carolina
 Webster Township, Jackson County, North Carolina, in Jackson County, North Carolina

North Dakota
 Webster Township, Ramsey County, North Dakota, in Ramsey County, North Dakota

Ohio
 Webster Township, Wood County, Ohio

Oklahoma
 Webster Township, Woodward County, Oklahoma

South Dakota
 Webster Township, Day County, South Dakota, in Day County, South Dakota

See also

Webster (disambiguation)

Township name disambiguation pages